Antiguraleus is a genus of sea snails, marine gastropod mollusks in the family Mangeliidae.

Species
Species within the genus Antiguraleus include:

 † Antiguraleus abbreviatus Powell 1944
 Antiguraleus abernethyi Dell, 1956
 † Antiguraleus abnormis (Hutton, 1885) 
 Antiguraleus adcocki (G.B. Sowerby III, 1896)
 Antiguraleus aeneus (Hedley, 1922)
 Antiguraleus alternatus (Laseron, 1954)
 Antiguraleus costatus (Hedley, 1922)
 † Antiguraleus deceptus Powell, 1942 
 Antiguraleus fenestratus Powell, 1942
 Antiguraleus fusiformis Dell, 1956
 Antiguraleus galatea Kilburn, 1994
 Antiguraleus howelli (Laseron, 1954)
 Antiguraleus infandus (Webster, 1906)
 Antiguraleus kingensis (Petterd, 1879)
 † Antiguraleus makaraensis Vella, 1954 
 Antiguraleus morgana (Barnard, 1958)
 Antiguraleus multistriatus Dell, 1956
 Antiguraleus mundus (Suter, 1909)
 Antiguraleus murrheus (Webster, 1906)
 Antiguraleus necostatus Kilburn, 1994
 Antiguraleus otagoensis Powell, 1942
 Antiguraleus pedicus Powell, 1942
 Antiguraleus perfluans (Barnard, 1958)
 Antiguraleus permutatus (Hedley, 1922)
 Antiguraleus pulcherrimus Dell, 1956
 † Antiguraleus rishworthi Vella, 1954 
 Antiguraleus rossianus Powell, 1942
 Antiguraleus sericeus Kilburn, 1994
 Antiguraleus serpentis (Laseron, 1954)
 Antiguraleus stellatomoides Shuto, 1983
 Antiguraleus subitus (Laseron, 1954)
 Antiguraleus subtruncatus Powell, 1942
 † Antiguraleus taranakiensis (Marwick, 1926) 
 Antiguraleus tepidus (Laseron, 1954)
 Antiguraleus ula (Watson, 1881)

Species brought into synonymy
 Antiguraleus costatus wilesianus (Hedley, 1922): synonym of Antiguraleus costatus (Hedley, 1922)
 Antiguraleus depressispirus (Beu, 1969): synonym of Antiguraleus ula (Watson, 1881)
 Antiguraleus emina (Hedley, 1905): synonym of Paraguraleus emina (Hedley, 1905) 
 Antiguraleus emina brevostium (Laseron, 1954): synonym of Antiguraleus kingensis brevostium  (C.F. Laseron, 1954)
 Antiguraleus infanda [sic]: synonym of Antiguraleus infandus (Webster, 1906)
 Antiguraleus lucidus (Laseron, 1954): synonym of Paraguraleus lucidus Laseron, 1954 
 Antiguraleus munda [sic]: synonym of Antiguraleus mundus (Suter, 1909)
 Antiguraleus thetis (E. A. Smith, 1904): synonym of Striatoguraleus thetis (E. A. Smith, 1904)
 Antiguraleus wilesianus (Hedley, 1922): synonym of Guraleus wilesianus Hedley, 1922

References

External links
 Bouchet, P.; Kantor, Y. I.; Sysoev, A.; Puillandre, N. (2011). A new operational classification of the Conoidea. Journal of Molluscan Studies. 77, 273-308
 
 Worldwide Mollusk Data base : Mangeliidae

 
Gastropod genera